U.S. Route 77 Business (US 77 Business or US 77-L) is a business loop of US 77 in Waco. 
The highway is the old alignment of US 77 through the city and was formerly signed as a US 77 & US 81 Business Route, but designated as Loop 491 on October 2, 1970 until it was changed to the current Business US 77 designation on June 21, 1990. The section of highway from Loop 484 to US 84 is a freeway, making it the only business route in Texas that is a freeway.

Route description
US 77-L begins as LaSalle Avenue in southern Waco. The highway's southern terminus with its parent route is at a traffic circle, along with Circle Drive and Valley Mills Drive. The highway runs along the eastern boundary of Baylor University before crossing the Brazos River. Now, South Loop Drive, the highway interchanges with Loop 484 and becomes a freeway. After crossing I-35 and US 84, the highway drops its freeway status and briefly enters Bellmead. The highway enters Lacy-Lakeview as the town's main street and ends at I-35/US 77, just short of Elm Mott.

Junction list

See also

References

External links

77 Business (Waco, Texas)
Transportation in McLennan County, Texas
77 Business (Waco)
Waco, Texas
Business (Waco, Texas)